SMART (Supersonic Missile Assisted Release of Torpedo) is a canister-based, long-range anti-submarine missile developed by the Defence Research and Development Organisation (DRDO) for the Indian Navy.

Description 
SMART is a canisterised hybrid system, made up of long-range missile carrier that can travel at supersonic speed and a lightweight torpedo as payload for anti-submarine warfare (ASW) role. The objective behind the project is to develop a quick reaction system that can launch torpedo from standoff distance. The missile has a range of 643 km (400 mi) carrying a light weight torpedo of range 20 km (12.5 mi) with 50 kg high explosive warhead. SMART uses two-way data link connected to airborne or ship based submarine detection and identification systems. SMART can be launched from a surface ship or a truck-based coastal battery. The missile delivery system was developed jointly by Defence Research Development Laboratory (DRDL) and Research Centre Imarat (RCI). Naval Science and Technological Laboratory (NSTL) developed the autonomous lightweight torpedo and associated technologies such as detonation mechanism, underwater guidance and underwater thruster. Aerial Delivery Research and Development Establishment (ADRDE) developed the velocity reduction mechanism that act before releasing an autonomous lightweight torpedo towards the designated target. SMART is part of fusion project to combine technologies of institutions dealing with land and naval based armaments. High Energy Materials Research Laboratory (HEMRL) developed the insensitive explosive formulations for naval warhead. Ministry of Defence (MoD) in 2018–19 annual report mentioned that DRDO started the development and demonstration of missile assisted release of light weight torpedo for ASW role. The ejection trial was done using Advanced Light Torpedo Shyena.

SMART provides Indian Navy the capability to target enemy submarines at extremely long standoff ranges. The missile is powered by dual stage solid-propellant rocket and electro-mechanical actuators for higher degree of automation. The in-flight guidance uses inertial navigation system (INS) with real-time course correction and target update mechanism while the missile fly at low altitude to decrease detection rate. SMART is similar in concept to the now cancelled UUM-125 Sea Lance from Boeing. The system is under-development due to increasing deployment of submarines by People's Liberation Army Navy Submarine Force (PLANSF) in the Indian Ocean Region (IOR), rapid modernization of naval assets by People's Liberation Army Navy (PLAN) and building of Chinese overseas military bases in Africa.

Trials

First trial 
The first successful test of SMART was done on 5 October 2020 from Abdul Kalam Island. This was part of demonstration test to check missile flight for maximum range and altitude, separation of the nose cone, release of torpedo and deployment of velocity reduction mechanism.

Second trial 
On 13 December 2021, the second test of SMART was conducted successfully from Integrated Test Range (ITR), Odisha. The entire trajectory was monitored by the electro-optic telemetry system, various range radars including the downrange instrumentation and downrange ships. The missile carried a torpedo, parachute delivery system and release mechanisms.

See also
RUM-139 VL-ASROC
Type 07 Vertical Launch Anti-submarine rocket
RPK-6 Vodopad/RPK-7 Veter
Hong Sang Eo
RPK-2 Vyuga
UUM-125 Sea Lance

References

Anti-submarine missiles